Cephaloticoccus is a Gram-negative and non-motile genus of bacteria from the family of Opitutaceae which occur in the guts of Cephalotes ants.

References

 

Verrucomicrobiota
Bacteria genera